This is a list of events during the year 2006 in Poland.

Incumbents

Events

January 
 28 January – Katowice Trade Hall roof collapse. 65 fatalities, over 170 wounded.

July
 24 July – The CBA begins its operations.
 28 July – President Lech Kaczyński calls for EU member states to reintroduce the death penalty. This angers the EU.

September
 3 September – The political party Left and Democrats is founded

November 
 12 November – 2006 Polish local elections, first round
 21 November  – 23 miners died in a blast in Halemba Coal Mine.
 26 November – Polish local elections, 2006, second round

Sport

 2005–06 Ekstraklasa
 2006 Mieczysław Połukard Criterium of Polish Speedway Leagues Aces
 2006 Polish Pairs Speedway Championship
 2005–06 Polish Basketball League
 2005–06 Polska Liga Hokejowa season
 2006 PLFA season
 2006 Polish Figure Skating Championships
 2006 Tour de Pologne
 Poland at the 2006 Winter Olympics
 Poland at the 2006 Winter Paralympics

Deaths 

 18 January: Jan Twardowski
 14 July: Aleksander Wojtkiewicz, chess grandmaster (b. 1963)

See also
2006 in Polish television

References

 
Poland
pl:2006#Wydarzenia w Polsce